Ian Pickavance (born 20 September 1968) is a former professional rugby league footballer who played in the 1990s.

Background
Pickavance was born in St. Helens, Lancashire, England.

Career

Club career
Pickavance played for St Helens from the interchange bench in the 1996 Challenge Cup Final, scoring a try in the second half and helping his team to a 40-32 victory over Bradford Bulls.

Ian Pickavance played right- (replaced by interchange/substitute Vila Matautia on 25-minutes) in St. Helens' 16-25 defeat by Wigan in the 1995–96 Regal Trophy Final during the 1995–96 at Alfred McAlpine Stadium, Huddersfield on Saturday 13 January 1996.

International

References

External links
Saints Heritage Society profile

1968 births
Living people
English rugby league players
Huddersfield Giants players
Hull F.C. players
Ireland national rugby league team players
Rugby articles needing expert attention
Rugby league players from St Helens, Merseyside
Rugby league second-rows
St Helens R.F.C. players
Swinton Lions players